Beilschmiedia micrantha is an Asian tree species in the family Lauraceae.  Records of occurrence include Borneo; no subspecies are listed in the Catalogue of Life.

References

Flora of Malesia
micrantha